Network address translation traversal is a computer networking technique of establishing and maintaining Internet protocol connections across gateways that implement network address translation (NAT).

NAT traversal techniques are required for many network applications, such as peer-to-peer file sharing and voice over IP.

Network address translation

NAT devices allow the use of private IP addresses on private networks behind routers with a single public IP address facing the Internet. The internal network devices communicate with hosts on the external network by changing the source address of outgoing requests to that of the NAT device and relaying replies back to the originating device.

This leaves the internal network ill-suited for hosting servers, as the NAT device has no automatic method of determining the internal host for which incoming packets are destined. This is not a problem for general web access and email. However, applications such as peer-to-peer file sharing, VoIP services, and video game consoles require clients to be servers as well. Incoming requests cannot be easily correlated to the proper internal host. Furthermore, many of these types of services carry IP address and port number information in the application data, potentially requiring substitution with deep packet inspection.

Network address translation technologies are not standardized. As a result, the methods used for NAT traversal are often proprietary and poorly documented. Many traversal techniques require assistance from servers outside of the masqueraded network. Some methods use the server only when establishing the connection, while others are based on relaying all data through it, which increases the bandwidth requirements and latency, detrimental to real-time voice and video communications.

NAT traversal techniques usually bypass enterprise security policies. Enterprise security experts prefer techniques that explicitly cooperate with NAT and firewalls, allowing NAT traversal while still enabling marshalling at the NAT to enforce enterprise security policies. IETF standards based on this security model are Realm-Specific IP (RSIP) and middlebox communications (MIDCOM).

Techniques 
The following NAT traversal techniques are available:
 Socket Secure (SOCKS) is a technology created in the early 1990s that uses proxy servers to relay traffic between networks or systems.  
 Traversal Using Relays around NAT (TURN) is a relay protocol designed specifically for NAT traversal.  
 NAT hole punching is a general technique that exploits how NATs handle some protocols (for example, UDP, TCP, or ICMP) to allow previously blocked packets through the NAT.  
 UDP hole punching
 TCP hole punching
ICMP hole punching
 Session Traversal Utilities for NAT (STUN) is a standardized set of methods and a network protocol for NAT hole punching.  It was designed for UDP but was also extended to TCP.  
 Interactive Connectivity Establishment (ICE) is a complete protocol for using STUN and/or TURN to do NAT traversal while picking the best network route available.  It fills in some of the missing pieces and deficiencies that were not mentioned by STUN specification.  
 UPnP Internet Gateway Device Protocol (IGDP) is supported by many small NAT gateways in home or small office settings. It allows a device on a network to ask the router to open a port.  
 NAT-PMP is a protocol introduced by Apple as an alternative to IGDP.
 PCP is a successor of NAT-PMP.  
 Application-level gateway (ALG) is a component of a firewall or NAT that allows for configuring NAT traversal filters.  It is claimed by numerous people that this technique creates more problems than it solves.

Symmetric NAT
The recent proliferation of symmetric NATs has reduced NAT traversal success rates in many practical situations, such as for mobile and public WiFi connections. Hole punching techniques, such as STUN and ICE, fail in traversing symmetric NATs without the help of a relay server, as is practiced in TURN. Techniques that traverse symmetric NATs by attempting to predict the next port to be opened by each NAT device were discovered in 2003 by Yutaka Takeda at Panasonic Communications Research Laboratory and in 2008 by researchers at Waseda University. Port prediction techniques are only effective with NAT devices that use known deterministic algorithms for port selection. This predictable yet non-static port allocation scheme is uncommon in large scale NATs such as those used in 4G LTE networks and therefore port prediction is largely ineffective on those mobile broadband networks.

IPsec
IPsec virtual private network clients use NAT traversal in order to have Encapsulating Security Payload packets traverse NAT. IPsec uses several protocols in its operation which must be enabled to traverse firewalls and network address translators:
 Internet Key Exchange (IKE) User Datagram Protocol (UDP) port 500
 Encapsulating Security Payload (ESP) IP protocol number 50
 Authentication Header (AH) IP protocol number 51
 IPsec NAT traversal UDP port 4500, if and only if NAT traversal is in use

Many routers provide explicit features, often called IPsec Passthrough.

In Windows XP, NAT traversal is enabled by default, but in Windows XP with Service Pack 2 it has been disabled by default for the case when the VPN server is also behind a NAT device, because of a rare and controversial security issue. IPsec NAT-T patches are also available for Windows 2000, Windows NT and Windows 98.

NAT traversal and IPsec may be used to enable opportunistic encryption of traffic between systems. NAT traversal allows systems behind NATs to request and establish secure connections on demand.

Hosted NAT traversal
Hosted NAT traversal (HNT) is a set of mechanisms, including media relaying and latching, that is widely used by communications providers for historical and practical reasons. The IETF advises against using latching over the Internet and recommends ICE for security reasons.

IETF standards documents
  Firewall Friendly FTP
  IP Network Address Translator (NAT) Terminology and Considerations
  Security Model with Tunnel-mode IPsec for NAT Domains
  Architectural Implications of NAT
  Traditional IP Network Address Translator (Traditional NAT)
  Protocol Complications with the IP Network Address Translator (NAT)
  Network Address Translator (NAT)-Friendly Application Design Guidelines
  IPsec-Network Address Translation (NAT) Compatibility
  Negotiation of NAT-Traversal in the IKE
  State of Peer-to-Peer (P2P) Communication across Network Address Translators (NATs)
  Interactive Connectivity Establishment (ICE): A Protocol for Network Address Translator (NAT) Traversal for Offer/Answer Protocols

See also

 Session border controller (SBC)
 Hole punching
 UDP hole punching
 TCP hole punching
 ICMP hole punching
 NAT Port Mapping Protocol (NAT-PMP)
 Port Control Protocol (PCP)
 Port forwarding

References

External links
 Problems and fact about modern day NAT traversal systems
 Autonomous NAT traversal – NAT to NAT communication without a third party
 Cornell University – Characterization and Measurement of TCP Traversal through NATs and Firewalls
 Columbia University – An Analysis of the Skype Peer-to-Peer Internet Telephony
 Peer to peer communication across Network Address Translators (UDP Hole Punching)

Computer network security
Network protocols
Network address translation
fa:پیمایش قابلیت NAT